John Stewart House may refer to:

John Stewart House (Columbus, Georgia), listed on the National Register of Historic Places in Muscogee County, Georgia
John Stewart Houses (Philadelphia, Pennsylvania), listed on the NRHP in Pennsylvania
John Stewart House (Decatur, Tennessee), listed on the National Register of Historic Places in Meigs County, Tennessee

See also
John Stuart House (disambiguation)
Stewart House (disambiguation)